Dory Previn is a solo studio LP by Dory Previn, released in 1974.  It was her first album for the Warner Brothers label, having left United Artists.

Critical reception
The New York Times wrote that "very few other singer/songwriters can match the wisdom and the wit of Previn whose work turns our psyches inside out."

Track listing
All tracks composed by Dory Previn

"Lover Lover Be My Cover"
"Coldwater Canyon"
"Atlantis"
"Mama Mama Comfort Me"
"Brando"
"New Rooms"
"The Empress of China"
"The Obscene Phone Call"
"The Crooked Christmas Star, '73"
"Did Jesus Have a Baby Sister?"

Personnel
Dory Previn – guitar, vocals
Ray Brown – acoustic bass
Bobby Bruce – violin
David Cohen – guitar
Buddy Collette – saxophone, flute, clarinet
Brian Davies – acoustic guitar
Dan Dugmore – pedal steel guitar
Pat Henderson – backing vocals
Peter Jameson – guitar
Tom Keene – keyboards
Carolyn Matthews – backing vocals
Myrna Matthews – backing vocals
Sherlie Matthews – backing vocals
Lincoln Mayorga – piano
Marti McCall – backing vocals
Joe Osborn – bass
Lyle Ritz – bass
Lisa Roberts – backing vocals
Ron Tutt – drums
Waddy Wachtel – guitar
Perry Botkin, Jr. – string arrangements, conductor, bazouki

References

1974 albums
Dory Previn albums
Albums produced by Nick Venet
Warner Records albums